Xavier Ladel Scruggs (born September 23, 1987) is an American former professional baseball first baseman. He played in Major League Baseball (MLB) for the St. Louis Cardinals and Miami Marlins, and in the KBO League for the NC Dinos.

Professional career

St. Louis Cardinals
Scruggs was drafted by the Seattle Mariners in the 50th round of the 2005 Major League Baseball Draft out of Poway High School in Poway, California, but did not sign and attended the University of Nevada, Las Vegas (UNLV) to play college baseball for the UNLV Rebels. During his three years at UNLV he hit .328/.427/.652 with 34 home runs and 112 runs batted in. After his junior year, Scruggs was drafted by the St. Louis Cardinals in the 19th round of the 2008 Draft and signed with the Cardinals.

Scruggs called up to the majors for the first time on September 4, 2014.  He made his major league debut that day, but his major league action in 2014 was brief.  He started the next season at Memphis.  After batting .274 with five home runs and 16 RBI in 17 games in April, he was named the Cardinals' organizations Player of the Month.  The Cardinals recalled him from Memphis on June 19, 2015.  Four days later against the Miami Marlins, he provided three hits and two RBI, including a game-tying double, in an eventual 4–3 win.  Another three-hit, two-RBI effort followed on June 27 in an 8–1 win over the Chicago Cubs.

Miami Marlins
On November 30, 2015, Scruggs signed a minor league deal with the Miami Marlins. He was called up from Triple-A to play first base for the Marlins on August 19, 2016, and hit his first career homer, a 2-run shot off Pirates pitcher Chad Kuhl, in a 3-1 Marlins win on August 20. On October 24, he was outrighted off of the team’s 40-man roster.

NC Dinos
Scruggs signed a one-year, $1 million contract with the NC Dinos of the KBO League on December 26, 2016. He became a free agent following the 2018 season. In two years with the Dinos in the KBO, Scruggs hit 61 home runs and drove in 208 runs.

Leones de Yucatán
On June 17, 2019, Scruggs signed with the Leones de Yucatán of the Mexican League. He was released on December 5, 2019.

Post-baseball career
In April 2021, Scruggs joined the St. Louis Cardinals baseball operations team as the Diversity, Equity, and Inclusion Consultant.
Xavier Scruggs has covered MLB for ESPN since 2021. In April 2022, Scruggs was hired as an inaugural panelist for the MLB Network show Off Base.

References

External links

UNLV Rebels bio

1987 births
Living people
African-American baseball players
People from Diamond Bar, California
Baseball players from California
Major League Baseball first basemen
St. Louis Cardinals players
Miami Marlins players
NC Dinos players
UNLV Rebels baseball players
Batavia Muckdogs players
Quad Cities River Bandits players
Palm Beach Cardinals players
Springfield Cardinals players
Memphis Redbirds players
Gigantes del Cibao players
American expatriate baseball players in the Dominican Republic
New Orleans Zephyrs players
Leones de Yucatán players
Águilas de Mexicali players
American expatriate baseball players in Mexico
American expatriate baseball players in South Korea
KBO League infielders
21st-century African-American sportspeople
Major League Baseball broadcasters
20th-century African-American people